Michael Beale (born 4 September 1980) is an English football coach who currently manages Scottish Premiership club Rangers.

Beale was assistant manager to Steven Gerrard at Rangers and Aston Villa. He has also coached at Chelsea, Liverpool and São Paulo.

Playing career 
Beale's playing career started at Charlton Athletic and, after being released by Charlton, he had short trials at FC Twente in the Netherlands, and at clubs in the United States, before calling an end to his playing days at the age of 21.

Coaching career 
Beale's next step in football was to invest some of the money he had made as a youth player into setting up a futsal club for children in his hometown of Bromley, South London. It was while training children here that he caught the attention of Chelsea Academy boss Neil Bath who, in 2002, offered him a role as a part-time youth coach at their Cobham Training Centre. As a coach of Chelsea's Under-7s and Under-9s squads, he worked with future Premier League footballers Tammy Abraham and Dominic Solanke.

After admitting to becoming somewhat frustrated with the lack of progression of young players into Chelsea's first team since the takeover of Roman Abramovich in 2003, Beale took an offer to work at the Liverpool Academy, beginning as the coach of the Under-16s team, before progressing to become coach of the Under-23s. It was in this role that Beale first worked alongside Steven Gerrard, who was coaching the Liverpool Under-18s at the time.

In January 2017, Beale, who was a long-time fan of South American football, accepted the opportunity to move to Brazilian club São Paulo, learning Portuguese to act as assistant to Rogério Ceni. However, six months later, Ceni and his backroom team were sacked after a string of poor results.

After a short time back working with Liverpool's youth set-up, Beale was contacted by Steven Gerrard to act as the first team coach at Rangers. In three years in Scotland under Gerrard, Beale and Gary McAllister,
Rangers won their 55th league title in 2020–21 league season preventing city rivals Celtic from winning ten in a row.

In November 2021, Gerrard was offered the role of manager at Aston Villa, following the sacking of Dean Smith. Beale and McAllister followed him to the Premier League club.

Managerial career

Queens Park Rangers 
On 1 June 2022, Beale was appointed first team coach at Championship side Queens Park Rangers. With QPR top of the Championship in October 2022, Beale was approached by Wolverhampton Wanderers to become their new manager, but reportedly turned them down.

Rangers 
On 28 November 2022, Beale accepted an approach to leave QPR and manage Scottish side Rangers, where he had worked previously as the first team coach under Steven Gerrard. Beale had a successful start to his Rangers managerial career, winning his first four matches in charge, after which he was named Scottish Premiership manager of the month for December.

Managerial statistics

Honours

Rangers 
Scottish League Cup runners up: 2022–23

References 

1980 births
Aston Villa F.C. non-playing staff
English footballers
Liverpool F.C. non-playing staff
Rangers F.C. non-playing staff
Chelsea F.C. non-playing staff
Living people
People from Bromley
English football managers
English Football League managers
Queens Park Rangers F.C. managers
Association football coaches

Charlton Athletic F.C. players
Rangers F.C. managers
Scottish Professional Football League managers
São Paulo FC non-playing staff